Mary Ann Sullivan is a former Democratic member of the Indiana House of Representatives, representing the 97th District from 2008 to 2012. Sullivan announced she would not run for another term for the House, instead opting to run for the Indiana State Senate and pose a challenge to incumbent Republican Senator Brent Waltz. After running unopposed in the Democratic primary, Sullivan ultimately lost in the general election to Waltz. She was then succeeded by Representative Justin Moed.

External links
Indiana State Legislature - Representative Mary Ann Sullivan official government website
Mary Ann Sullivan for State House Representative official campaign website
Profile at Project Vote Smart
Follow the Money - Mary Ann Sullivan
2008 campaign contributions

Democratic Party members of the Indiana House of Representatives
1959 births
Living people
Politicians from Indianapolis
Women state legislators in Indiana